The Siebel Scholars program was established by the Thomas and Stacey Siebel Foundation in 2000 to recognize the most talented students at 29 graduate schools of business, computer science, bioengineering, and energy science in the United States, China, France, Italy, and Japan.

Funding for the Siebel Scholars program was established through grants totaling more than $45 million.  Each year, top graduate students from each institution are selected as Siebel Scholars. Siebel Scholars are selected by the Deans of each school on the basis of outstanding academic performance and qualities of leadership to receive a $35,000 award.  The specific process varies from school to school.

Siebel Scholars are key advisors to the Siebel Foundation, guiding the development of innovative programs the foundation initiates. The annual Siebel Scholars conference and ongoing planning sessions throughout the year are an integral part of the Siebel Scholars program.

Participating Schools

Graduate Schools of Business 
 Massachusetts Institute of Technology (Sloan School of Management)
 Northwestern University (Kellogg School of Management)
 Stanford University (Stanford Graduate School of Business)
 University of Chicago (Booth School of Business)
 Harvard University (Harvard Business School)
 University of Pennsylvania (Wharton School of Business)

Graduate Schools of Computer Science 
 Carnegie Mellon University
 Harvard University
 Massachusetts Institute of Technology
 Princeton University
 Stanford University
 Tsinghua University
 University of California, Berkeley
 University of Illinois at Urbana-Champaign
 University of Chicago

Graduate Schools of Bioengineering 
 Johns Hopkins University, Whiting School of Engineering and Johns Hopkins School of Medicine
 Massachusetts Institute of Technology, MIT School of Engineering
 Stanford University, Stanford University School of Engineering and Stanford University School of Medicine
 University of California, Berkeley, UC Berkeley College of Engineering
 University of California, San Diego, Institute of Engineering in Medicine and Jacobs School of Engineering

Graduate Schools of Energy Science 

 Carnegie Mellon University, Carnegie Mellon School of Computer Science
 École Polytechnique, Graduate School
 Massachusetts Institute of Technology, MIT School of Engineering
 Politecnico di Torino, Doctoral School
 Princeton University, Princeton University School of Engineering and Applied Science
 Stanford University, Stanford University School of Earth, Energy & Environmental Sciences
 Tsinghua University, Laboratory for Low Carbon Energy
 University of California, Berkeley, UC Berkeley College of Engineering
 University of Illinois at Urbana-Champaign, UIUC College of Engineering
 University of Tokyo, School of Engineering

Annual Siebel Scholars Conference 

A key element of the program is the annual Siebel Scholars Conference.  Each year, current and past Scholars convene at the annual Conference.  The Scholars gather with university faculty and thought leaders to discuss and debate global issues.

Conference Topics & Speakers 

 2000 Conference at University of Chicago - Global Security and Human Genome Project
 Speakers: General Alexander Haig; Roger Cossack, Zbigniew Brzezinski, Robert M. Gates, John Major, Aristides A.N. Patrinos, Charles DeLisi
 2001 Conference at MIT - Crisis Management and Global Terrorism
 Speakers: Dr. Jerry Linenger, Kurt Muse, Norman Schwarzkopf, Denny Fitch, Benjamin Netanyahu, William Gavin, Scott O'Grady
 2002 Conference at Stanford University - Stem Cell Research and The Role of the State in Regulating the Economy
 Speakers: Alice M. Rivlin, Richard C. Breeden, Dr. Arthur Caplan, Robert Reich,  Irving L. Weissman, William Kristol
 2004 Conference at University of Illinois at Urbana-Champaign - A Discussion of Justice in America
 Speakers: Ron Angelone, Craig Haney, Bernard B. Kerik, Nadine Strossen, Alan Elsner, Marc Mauer, William J. Fraser
 2005 Conference at University of Chicago - The Methamphetamine Crisis in America
 Speakers: Michael O. Leavitt, Barry R. McCaffrey, Mike McGrath, A. Thomas McLellan, David Murray, Bryan Samuels, Richard W. Sanders, S. Alex Stalcup, Eames Yates
 2007 Conference at University of California, Berkeley - The Economics of Alternative Energy
 Speakers: Spencer Abraham, Carol Browner, Myron Ebell, Daniel C. Esty, Ben Lieberman, Jon Meacham, Angus Rockett, Richard Swanson, Jerry Taylor
 2008 Conference at Northwestern University - Water: The Next Global Crisis?
 Speakers: Terry L. Anderson, Nigel Asquith, Maude Barlow, Joseph Dellapenna, Peter Gleick, Robert Glennon, Clay J. Landry, Lewis H. Lapham, Gary Libecap, Pat Mulroy, Rodney Smith, Kimberly Strassel, Barton H."Buzz" Thompson, Jr.
 2010 Conference at Massachusetts Institute of Technology - Energy and Climate
 Speakers: Doug Arent, Heidi Cullen, Thomas Friedman, Thomas Kalil, Doug May, Stephen W. Pacala, Arati Prabhakar, Andrew Revkin, Jim Rogers, Richard Sandor, Daniel P. Schrag, Stephen Stokes
 2011 Conference at Janelia Farm Research Campus of the Howard Hughes Medical Institute - Synthetic Biology
 Speakers: Frances Arnold, Arthur Caplan, Alta Charo, Greg Conko, Jay Keasling, Michael Krasny (talk show host), Ed Penhoet, Arti Rai, Vandana Shiva, Craig Venter
 2012 Conference at University of California, Berkeley - Class Warfare in America'
 Speakers: David Brooks, Niall Ferguson, William Galston, Lewis H. Lapham, Charles Murray, Ralph Nader, Robert Reich, Condoleezza Rice 
2017 Conference at National Academy of Sciences Building of the National Academy of Sciences - Energy Grid Cybersecurity: Threats and Solutions
Speakers: Robert Gates , Ted Koppel, Tim Conway, Robert M. Lee, Kevin Mandia, Liam Ó Murchú
2018 Conference at Stanford University - The Social Implications of AI''
Speakers: Garry Kasparov , Alan S. Murray, Ajay Agrawal, Pedro Domingos, Deirdre Mulligan, Mark Nehmer, Naveen Rao, Max Tegmark

References 

Educational foundations in the United States
Scholarships in the United States
Awards established in 2000